Castolin Eutectic was established in 1906 by Jean-Pierre Wasserman in Lausanne, Switzerland.
He discovered a new method of low-temperature brazing of cast iron, which was a revolutionary process for the repair and wear-protection of metals.  During the last decades fluxes, brazing alloys as well as coating and welding equipment and consumables have been developed and the company is present with its own subsidiaries in over 100 countries on all five continents.

PARAGON PARTNERS
Castolin Eutectic reinforced its position in 2020 with a new shareholder.

Products 
The 4 principal product areas are:
 Welding consumables and equipment
 Brazing consumables, fluxes and equipment
 Coating consumables and equipment
 Wear plates and engineered parts

History 

 1906 Foundation of Castolin in Lausanne, Switzerland
 1940 Foundation of Eutectic Welding Alloys Corporation in New York City
 1959 Foundation of Eutectic Japan Ltd
 1962 Foundation of Eutectic India Ltd - a joint venture with the company Larsen & Toubro, with products marketed under the name of L&T EWAC Alloys
 1960's Start of first CastoLab workshops
 1970's Development of Cored wire and production
 1980's Development of world's first gas atomised powder production
 1991 CDP® Wearplate development and production
 1996 Creation of Global Industry Program
 2005 Part of the Messer World.
 2006 100 years anniversary
 2007 Opening of the World's most advanced powder production facility and introduction of first NanoAlloy® welding consumable
 2008 Castolin Services growth and acquisitions in the United Kingdom, Russia, United States, Canada, China, Austria, Norway, Hungary, Belgium.
 2013 Acquisition of Monitor Coatings, technology leader for surface engineering in extreme environments with facilities in the UK, Singapore and China.
 2014 Acquisition of Whertec, a privately owned company with headquarters in Jacksonville, Florida, USA. Over the past years Whertec has secured a leading position in the boiler coatings market covering the power, recycling, biomass, steel and pulp & paper industries.
 2015 Geographical expansion by Joint Venture agreements in Nigeria and Saudi Arabia
 2017 Acquisition of FMP Coatings. FMP specializes in inorganic-hybrid coatings.
 2020 Paragon Partners acquired all shares in Castolin Eutectic.

References

External links 
 castolin.com
 Environmental Expert.com
 Paragon.de

Technology companies established in 1906
Manufacturing companies of Switzerland
Manufacturing companies established in 1906
1906 establishments in Switzerland